Perth and Kinross was a county constituency of the House of Commons of the Parliament of the United Kingdom from 1983 to 1997. It elected one Member of Parliament (MP) by the first past the post system of election.

Boundaries 

The Perth and Kinross constituency was largely a replacement for the Perth and East Perthshire constituency. As first used in the 1983 general election, it covered part of the region of Tayside, which had been created in 1975, under the Local Government (Scotland) Act 1973, as a region of three districts, including the district of Perth and Kinross. In 1997 the Perth and Kinross constituency was largely replaced by the Perth constituency.

Members of Parliament

Election results

Elections of the 1980s

Elections of the 1990s

References 

Historic parliamentary constituencies in Scotland (Westminster)
Politics of Perth and Kinross
Constituencies of the Parliament of the United Kingdom established in 1983
Constituencies of the Parliament of the United Kingdom disestablished in 1997